Hampson Boren Gary (April 23, 1873 in Tyler, Texas – April 18, 1952 in Palm Beach, Florida) was a Colonel, United States Army and American diplomat.

Biography
Gary was born to parents Franklin Newman and Martha Isabella (Boren) Gary.  In 1886, after their deaths, he was placed under the legal guardianship of Dr. F. M. Hicks. After attending Bingham School in North Carolina and the University of Virginia in 1894, he practiced law in Tyler.

On June 24, 1896, Gary was commissioned a first lieutenant in the Fifth Infantry and was captain of Company K, Fourth Texas Volunteer Infantry Regiment during the Spanish-American War.  When the war ended, he served with the Texas National Guard as colonel of the Third Texas Infantry Regiment.

Gary was a member of the Texas House of Representatives, January 8, 1901 – January 13, 1903, and the board of regents of the University of Texas, 1909–10.

Beginning in 1914, he served in various positions within the State Department.  In 1919, Gary went to Paris to work with the American Commission to Negotiate Peace, and on April 1, 1920, he was appointed Envoy Extraordinary and Minister Plenipotentiary to Switzerland which was a joint appointment to Liechtenstein by President Wilson. Gary attended the First Assembly of the League of Nations in Geneva as an observer for the United States.  Gary served as Agent/Consul General to Egypt from 1918–1919.

Gary was also a commissioner for the Federal Communications Commission from July 11, 1934 - January 1, 1935.

He is interred in Arlington National Cemetery.

References

1873 births
1952 deaths
United States Army colonels
People from Tyler, Texas
University of Virginia alumni
Texas lawyers
Members of the Texas House of Representatives
20th-century American diplomats
Burials at Arlington National Cemetery
Members of the Federal Communications Commission
Franklin D. Roosevelt administration personnel